Mary Hays Weik (1898–1979) was an American children's book author and activist for world government.

Weik was born on December 18, 1898, in Greencastle, Indiana, daughter of the biographer Jesse W. Weik. She  was the author of The Jazz Man, which received a Newbery Honor in 1967. Her daughter was the author and illustrator Ann Grifalconi.

She wrote booklets for the American Federation of World Citizens and the Committee to End Radiological Hazards.

Weik died on December 25, 1979, in Manhattan, New York. Her papers are held at the University of Michigan.

Works
 Adventure: A Book of Verse, 1919
 The House at Cherry Hill, 1938
 A World Set Free, 1954
 Shadow over America, 1962
 The Jazz Man, 1966
 The Scarlet Thread: A Group of One Act Plays for Young People, 1968
 A House on Liberty Street, 1973

References

1898 births
1979 deaths
American children's writers
Newbery Honor winners
People from Putnam County, Indiana
Activists from Indiana
American political writers
20th-century American women